Act IV: Rebirth In Reprise is the sixth studio album by American rock band The Dear Hunter, and was released on September 4, 2015 through Equal Vision Records. The album is the fourth part in a six-act story. The story follows the conclusion of Act III: Life and Death, in which the protagonist assumes the identity of his deceased half-brother after the resolution of the First World War.

Development
On March 3, 2015, Casey Crescenzo made an announcement on The Dear Hunter website that Act IV: Rebirth in Reprise was in development.
 
On April 7, 2015, Casey began putting videos on YouTube regarding The Dear Hunter's 2015 Act II and III tour. These videos also contained teasers for Act IV. He released eight videos, with the last video being uploaded April 24.

On June 16, the single "A Night on the Town" became available for streaming on the band's official website, and the album became available for preorder.

On July 8, The Dear Hunter announced their forthcoming single "Waves", which was released the following day.

Another single entitled "Wait" was released almost a month later, August 7

The album debuted at #39 on the Billboard 200 selling approximately 7,000 copies - both figures are career-highs for the band.

Track listing

Personnel

The Dear Hunter
Casey Crescenzo - lead vocals, piano, guitar, acoustic guitar, rhodes, organ, synth, aux. percussion
Nick Crescenzo - drums, percussion
Rob Parr - guitar, acoustic guitar, vocals, piano, organ
Nick Sollecito - bass guitar
Max Tousseau - guitar, synth
Additional musicians
Judy Crescenzo - additional vocals
Tivoli Breckenridge - additional vocals

Production
Casey Crescenzo - producer, engineer
Nick Crescenzo, Max Tousseau, Phil Crescenzo - additional engineering
Mike Watts - mixing engineer
Fesse Nichols - recording engineer
Jason Butler - assistant engineer
Brian Adam McCune - music preparation
Kevin Pereira -  commissioned all orchestral tracks 
Nicky Barkla - album art
Joel Kanitz - album layout & design
Francesca Caldara, Dan Sandshaw - A&R
Recorded in Port Angeles, WA
Orchestral tracks recorded on 4, 7, 10, 11 January 2015 at Fantasy Studios, Berkeley, CA

Orchestra
Casey Crescenzo - orchestrations
Brian Adam McCune - additional orchestrations
Featuring members of Awesöme Orchestra
David Möschler - conductor/music director
Jenny Hanson - flute
Arturo Rodriguez  - piccolo
Ashley Ertz, Sue Crum - oboe
James Pytko, Carolyn Walter - clarinet
Scott Alexander - bassoon
Kris King - contrabassoon
Jon Betts, Heidi Trefethen, Phil Hobson, Nick Carnes - horn
Harlow Carpenter, Michael Cox, Justin Smith - trumpet
Allison Gomer, Bruce Colman - trombone
Jeremy Carrillo - bass trombone
Robinson Love - tuba
Lily Sevier - timpani, percussion
Liza Wallace - harp
Ishtar Hernandez, Laura Shifley, Ann Eastman, Shaina Evoniuk, Lucy Giraldo, Moses Lei - violin
Christina Owens, Christina Lesicko, Alice Eastman - viola
Sam Leachman, Karen Hsu, Kane Suga, Cindy Hickox - cello
Travis Kindred, Amanda Wu, Alex Van Gils - double bass
 String quartet on "Waves" and "Is There Anybody Here"

Charts

References 

2015 albums
The Dear Hunter albums
Equal Vision Records albums
Concept albums
Rock operas
Sequel albums